Tizahang (also Romanized as Tīzāhang; also known as Tīzāng) is a village in Howmeh Rural District, in the Central District of Bam County, Kerman Province, Iran. At the 2006 census, its population was 31, in 7 families.

References 

Populated places in Bam County